Leisure is the debut studio album by the English rock band Blur, released in August 1991 by record label Food.

Content 

The original version of "Sing", entitled "Sing (To Me)", was recorded as a demo in late 1989 under the band's former name, Seymour, and can be heard on the ultra-rare promo-only single which was released over a decade later in February 2000 and on the first of a 4-disc set with rare material in the Blur 21 box set.

The cover photograph was taken in May 1954 by Charles Hewitt, for a Picture Post fashion feature on bathing hats, "Glamour in the Swim".

Release 

The album was released on 26 August 1991 in the United Kingdom by record label Food. It was released in the US a month later with a different track listing: this version is frontloaded with Blur's three UK singles, and the song "Sing" was replaced by "I Know", previously an A-side with "She's So High" (see track listings for exact changes). The Canadian version has the same track listing as the UK version.

Leisure peaked at number 7 in the UK Albums Chart. The album was certified Gold in the UK.

As part of the album's 21st anniversary, Leisure was remastered and reissued along with the band's other studio albums on 30 July 2012. The album was reissued a second time, on coloured vinyl, on August 26, 2016.

Reception and legacy 

Leisure received mixed reviews from the British music press. A highly enthusiastic David Cavanagh wrote in Select magazine that "The four Blur boys have guaranteed themselves a hefty leg-up in the being-taken-seriously stakes with the thrills they've carved into the grooves of Leisure." He concluded that "Leisure, in short, is one of those happy occasions when the hype is dead right." Q magazine's Paul Davies rated the album four out of five stars, and felt it fulfilled the early promise Blur showcased: "This latest bunch of floppy-fringed pop cadets in baggy clothing should consummate their burgeoning pop romance in fine style", Davies elaborated, "for Leisure is a substantially stocked treasure-chest of hit singles just waiting to happen." Alexis Petridis however, stated that "on the evidence of this album, they don't appear to know what they're doing and as a result make appalling mistakes all over the place". He also described the lyrics as "bad".

In a 2007 interview, lead singer Damon Albarn expressed distaste for the album, describing it as "awful" and being one of the two "bad records" he has made in his career (the other being Blur album The Great Escape). Albarn further expanded on the album's recording in 2014, explaining that "it wasn't a particularly happy experience" and suggested the band were too keen to please the record label by capitalising on a sound that was popular at the time. The band rarely played tracks from the album live in later tours, with only the singles "There's No Other Way" and "She's So High" being frequently included in setlists.

"Sing" was included on the Trainspotting soundtrack in 1996. In 2008, Coldplay announced upon the release of Viva la Vida or Death and All His Friends that "Sing" provided a starting point for "Lost!".

Track listing

Note: The US and Japan editions of the album have different track listings.

Personnel
Blur
Damon Albarn – lead vocals, keyboards, production on "Sing", "Inertia" and "Mr. Briggs"
Graham Coxon – guitars, backing vocals, production on "Sing", "Inertia" and "Mr. Briggs"
Alex James – bass, production on "Sing", "Inertia" and "Mr. Briggs"
Dave Rowntree – drums, percussion, production on "Sing", "Inertia" and "Mr. Briggs"
Technical
 Steve Lovell – production on "She's So High" and "I Know"
 Steve Power – production on "She's So High" and "I Know"
 Mike Thorne – production on "Fool", "Birthday" and "Wear Me Down"
 Stephen Street – production on "There's No Other Way", "Bang", "Slow Down", "Repetition", "Bad Day", "High Cool" and "Come Together"

Charts and certifications

Weekly charts

Certifications

References

External links

Leisure at YouTube (streamed copy where licensed)
 

1991 debut albums
Blur (band) albums
Albums produced by Stephen Street
Albums produced by Damon Albarn
Albums produced by Mike Thorne
Shoegaze albums by English artists
Food Records albums